Klickitat may refer to:

 Klickitat (tribe)
 Klickitat language
 Klickitat War of 1855
 Klickitat County, Washington
 Klickitat, Washington
 Klickitat River, a tributary of the Columbia River, in Washington State
 MV Klickitat, a member of the Washington State Ferries fleet
 Klickitat Trail
 Klickitat Street, city street  in northeast Portland, Oregon, United States
 Klickitat dialect
 Klickitat Glacier, on the  slopes of Mount Adams a stratovolcano in the U.S. state of Washington
 Klickitat Mineral Springs
 Klickitat aster, flowering plant in the family Asteraceae  
 USS Klickitat (AOG-64), lead ship of the type T1 Klickitat-class gasoline tanker built for the US Navy during World War II
 Klickitat Elementary and High School,  public school  in Klickitat, Washington 

Language and nationality disambiguation pages